Marcel Glăvan (born 9 March 1975 in Drăgușeni) is a Romanian-born Spanish flatwater canoer who competed from the mid-1990s to the early 2000s (decade). During the mid-1990s, he won two world championship titles in the C-4 event. He was an Olympic silver medalist at the 1996 Summer Olympics in the C-2 1000 m event with partner Antonel Borșan. He also won a C-4 1000 m gold medal at the 1997 European Championships in Plovdiv, Bulgaria.

Competition for a place in the Romanian national team is famously stiff and after a disappointing seventh place in the C-4 1000 m at the 1998 world championships team leader Ivan Patzaichin dropped various stars, including Glăvan. He thus found himself an ex-international at the age of just 23. In 2000, he took Spanish nationality and represented his adopted country at the 2001 and 2002 world championships, reaching the C-4 1000 m final both times.

He is now a coach for High Performance "Infanta Cristina".

References

1975 births
Canoeists at the 1996 Summer Olympics
Living people
Olympic canoeists of Romania
Olympic silver medalists for Romania
Romanian male canoeists
Spanish male canoeists
Spanish people of Romanian descent
Romanian emigrants to Spain
Olympic medalists in canoeing
ICF Canoe Sprint World Championships medalists in Canadian
Medalists at the 1996 Summer Olympics